Hikari is a line of specialty fish food brand manufactured by Kyorin Food Industries, Ltd. in Japan.

History and profile

Kyorin Food Industries, Ltd. is a part of the Kamihata Fish Industry Group together with its sister companies namely the Kamihata Fish Industries, Ltd. and the Kyorin Company, Ltd.  The history of Kyorin Food Industries, Ltd. as a cultivator of Koi, goldfish and fish diets dates back to 1877 when a Japanese named Tozaemon Kamihata started Koi carp cultivation.  In 1946, another Kamihata, Tokichi Kamihata, opened a Koi carp store in Himeji City, Hyōgo Prefecture, Japan.  Then in 1961, Shigezo Kamihata established the Kamihata Fish Industries, Ltd. The Kyorin Company, Ltd. was formally established in 1968 to manage the wholesale division of Kamihata Fish Industries, Ltd.  The Kamihata Group then established other branches in Japan including Tokyo (1989), Hongkong (1991), China (1999) and Singapore (2001).  It has a representative office in the United States under the company name, Hikari USA.

Kamihata Fish Industries Ltd. exhibited their specialty products at the Interzoo Exhibition in 2004 and 2006, which is an international pet business exhibition, at Nuremberg Messe, Germany.

Hikari foods and fancy goldfish headgrowths
Izhak Kroshinsky, a leading American Ranchu goldfish breeder and co-author of the book The Fancy Goldfish: A Complete Guide to Care and Collecting (Chapter 10, Breeding Ranchus, page 171) wrote: "Some manufacturers of pellet foods claim to incorporate headgrowth enhancers. I have used Hikari's lionhead pellets, and they do seem to accelerate headgrowth.

See also
Fish food

References

Bibliography
Hikari-Kamihata Products Review, The Koi Supply Website, KoiSupply.com, date retrieved: 28 May 2007
Hikari Products Review: "Who is Hikari?", Myfishfood.com, date retrieved: 28 May 2007
An Aquarium Product Review - Hikari Betta Bio-Gold Pellets by guest author Jilly Florio, from the "Fish Site" of Mary Brennecke, BellaOnline Fish Editor, date retrieved: 28 May 2007
Feature Article: The Successful Aquarium Culture of Goniopora Species (Table of Contents No. 5: "Feeding your Goniopora") by Justin Credabel from Advanced Aquarist’s Online Magazine (Reefs.org Publication) Volume IV, October 2005, date retrieved: 28 May 2007
The TTABlog, "Keeping Tabs on the TTAB" by John L. Welch, Tuesday, April 10, 2007, Legal article on Hikari Algae Wafer, date retrieved: 28 May 2007
Hikari Company in the European Union, an article, date retrieved: 28 May 2007
Kamihata Fish Inc., Ltd. - Hikari (United States), an exhibitor at Zoomark International, Bologna, Italy, May 2007; date retrieved: 28 May 2007
Kamihata Fish Inc. Ltd – Hikari (Exhibitor's profile), Zoomark International, Bologna, Italy, May 2007; date retrieved: 28 May 2007
Feed companies with products registered in Utah, Utah.gov, date retrieved: 28 May 2007
Feed products registered in Utah, Utah.gov, date retrieved: 28 May 2007
"Winter's Effect On Koi, Goldfish, and Ponds" by Richard E. Carlson (Noting Protein Levels and Contents of Three Hikari USA Company Food for Koi, date retrieved: 28 May 2007
 "Triops Food and Recipes" by Stuart Halliday (Quoting Hikari As A Popular Commercial Quality Food Brand), date retrieved: 28 May 2007
Distributor in Thailand

Food and drink companies of Japan
Fishkeeping
Fish food brands